Barris is a surname. Notable people with the surname include:

Alex Barris (1922–2004), American-born Canadian television actor and writer
Chuck Barris (1929–2017), American game show producer and presenter
George Barris (auto customizer) (1925–2015), American designer of custom automobiles
George Barris (photographer) (1922–2016), American photographer of Marilyn Monroe
Harry Barris (1905–1962), American popular singer
Ted Barris (born 1949), Canadian writer and broadcaster

See also
Barris Industries, former American television production company founded by Chuck Barris
Nou Barris, district of Barcelona, Spain
Vaza-Barris River, Brazil
Barriss Offee, a Jedi apprentice in the prequel era of the Star Wars universe
Moss Barris, a character in the novel Star Wars: Thrawn

pt:Barris